Nirmal Chandra Sen Gupta was the eleventh Governor of the Reserve Bank of India from 19 May 1975 to 19 August 1975.

He was the interim governor until K R Puri took office. Prior to that, he was the secretary to the Department of Banking of the Ministry of Finance. Even though his tenure was short, his signature appears on the Indian rupee note of 1000 denomination. This is the only note that bears his signature.

References

Bengali people
Governors of the Reserve Bank of India
Indian bankers
Indian civil servants
Living people
University of Calcutta alumni
Year of birth missing (living people)